Yangtze Memory Technologies Corp (YMTC) is a Chinese semiconductor integrated device manufacturer specializing in flash memory (NAND) chips. Founded in Wuhan, China, in 2016, with government investment and a goal of reducing the country's dependence on foreign chip manufacturers, the company was formerly a subsidiary of partially state-owned enterprise Tsinghua Unigroup. Its consumer products are marketed under the brand Zhitai.

As of 2020, YMTC is using a 20 nm process to make 64-layer 3D NAND flash. In April 2020, the company unveiled its first 128 layers vertical NAND chip based on Xtacking architecture, which has since entered production.

History
Tsinghua Unigroup founded YMTC in July 2016, with a total investment of US$24 billion, including investments from the Hubei provincial government and the Chinese national "Big Fund" China Integrated Circuit Industry Investment Fund.

In 2018, YMTC released its Xtacking architecture designed for Vertical NAND chips. Xtacking enables YMTC to manufacture the memory and the logic circuits on separate wafers and connect them using plasma activation and thermal annealing. According to YMTC, this enables a higher speed for the production process and increases NAND performance. YMTC's 3D NAND flash memory chips were the first to be domestically mass-produced in China. Later in 2018, YMTC announced mass production of its 32-layer 3D NAND flash memory chip, and in September 2019, YMTC reported that it had started mass-producing its 64-layer TLC 3D NAND flash memory chip, with both chips using its Xtacking architecture.

In April 2020, YMTC announced that it had developed a 128-layer 1.33 Tb flash memory chip. In September 2020, YMTC unveiled its first consumer line products under the brand name Zhitai. Products include SATA and M.2 SSDs based on its 64 layers Xtacking NAND chips. From 2020 to 2021, YMTC suffered from unsatisfactory yield from its initial risk production of the 128-layer memory chip, averaging around 30 to 40 percent. In September 2021, the company's chief operating officer announced YMTC had shipped over 300 million 64-layer flash chips, and its 128-layer QLC memory chip is ready for volume production.

As of 2021, YMTC was planning its second fab with a capacity of 100,000 wafers per month which will double its total output to 200,000 wpm. News agencies reported in January 2022 that YMTC has scrapped its intention to build a second 3D NAND fab announced in 2017, citing serious financial issues at Tsinghua Unigroup, its parent firm. Bloomberg News reported in March 2022 that Apple is exploring purchasing NAND chips from YMTC to diversify its NAND chip vendors. In May 2022, PCI-SIG lists two SSD controllers from YMTC as verified, indicating YMTC is following in the footsteps of its competitors by designing its own SSD controllers. In July 2022, the CEO of YMTC was detained by Chinese authorities. He was reported to have resigned from the company shortly thereafter.

In August 2022, Chinese Communist Party-owned tabloid Global Times claimed that YMTC has unveiled the X3-9070, its first 232 layer 3d NAND chip. In October 2022, Apple Inc. announced that it would drop a plan to use YMTC memory chips in its phones.

In 2022, a TechInsights report stated that YMTC had delivered 232-layer 3D NAND Flash to the market (HikSemi CC700 2 TB SSD).

International reception

United States

In July 2021, U.S. Representatives Michael McCaul and Bill Hagerty wrote a letter to the United States Secretary of Commerce arguing that YMTC should be placed on the department's Entity List. The letter stated that YMTC will assist the Chinese government in using unfair trade tactics to force American competitors out of the memory-chip sector, thereby putting US national security at jeopardy. It also highlights YMTC's alleged close ties with the Chinese Communist Party and Chinese military, as some YMTC executives previously worked for Semiconductor Manufacturing International Corporation, which was added to the Entity List in December 2020.

In April 2022, U.S. Senator Marco Rubio voiced his displeasure with reports that Apple was considering procuring NAND chips from YMTC. YMTC, according to Rubio, has ties to the Chinese Communist Party and the People's Liberation Army. In September 2022, additional legislators urged the White House to put YMTC on the entity list after a report was released about YMTC's supply of chips to Huawei. In October 2022, the Biden administration announced 31 Chinese companies, including YMTC, were being added to the Unverified List. On December 15th, the Biden administration added YMTC to a trade blacklist. The James M. Inhofe National Defense Authorization Act for Fiscal Year 2023 also banned the U.S. federal government from buying or using chips from YMTC.

See also
Semiconductor industry in China
List of semiconductor fabrication plants

References

External links 

 

Manufacturing companies based in Wuhan
Computer hardware companies
Computer memory companies
Consumer electronics brands
Computer storage companies
Semiconductor companies of China
Chinese companies established in 2016
Chinese brands
Government-owned companies of China